Good News for People Who Love Bad News is the fourth studio album by American rock band Modest Mouse, released on April 6, 2004 by Epic Records. Founding member Jeremiah Green did not perform on this album due to his temporary absence from the band, and it would be the only release during his time with Modest Mouse that he would not appear on.

Good News for People Who Love Bad News was nominated for the Grammy Award for Best Alternative Music Album in 2005. It was certified platinum by the RIAA in August 2004, and had sold over 1.5 million copies in the United States by 2006. Three singles were released from the album: "Float On", "Ocean Breathes Salty", and "The World at Large".

Reception

Good News for People Who Love Bad News was released to widespread acclaim from music critics. At Metacritic, which assigns a normalized rating out of 100 to reviews from mainstream critics, the album received an average score of 83, indicating "universal acclaim". Tiny Mix Tapes gave the album all five stars and said that "Ultimately, what makes Good News so successful is that it retains the melancholy mood of past works, while at the same time adding depth and maturity." Spin gave it an A and said it was "Half expansive, burnished radio-rock, half swampy Delta hoodoo-hollerin' that reeks of Brock's Southern sojourn." Filter gave it a score of 92% and said that it would soon be "one of the best albums of 2004". NME gave it a score of nine out of ten and called it "A real-life pop record. Well, not pop in the Girls Aloud sense of the word obviously, more in the drop-dead, fuzz-box brilliant 'Here Comes Your Man' sense." Billboard gave it a favorable review and called it "a daring yet accessible disc". The New York Times also gave it a favorable review and called it "the best Modest Mouse album yet." E! Online gave it a B+ and said that "If there's a touchstone band for this album, it's Little Creatures-era Talking Heads cranking out songs that are joyously eccentric, celebratory and catchy." Playlouder gave it four stars out of five and stated: "It just feels that amidst his bare and heartfelt explorations of life and the old wooden box wherein we all end up, Brock has learned to dance, learned to allow himself a smile." Mojo gave the album four stars out of five and said that "Moments of simple, exultant joy are plentiful." Q also gave it four stars out of five and said that the album consisted of "45 bonkers minutes". Alternative Press likewise gave it four stars out of five and stated, "If Good News... isn't the pillar-like masterpiece Modest Mouse fans have waited years for, it's proof that things haven't completely fallen apart." Dusted gave it a favorable review and called it "a more varied album than The Moon and Antarctica (which did seem to have only one speed), and with the return of original member Dan Gallucci, Brock appears to have revived the heavy lead guitar playing of their early work." The A.V. Club also gave it a favorable review and stated, "The songs still rely on Brock's echoing guitar patterns and Mobius-strip lyrics, delivered in the voice of a harried, hip-hop-inflected square-dance caller, but though the vehicle stays the same, the scenery outside the window changes considerably."

Neumu.net gave it a score of seven out of ten and said, "While the album is not as cohesive a vision, many of its songs are more focused." The Austin Chronicle gave it three-and-a-half stars out of five and said, "No bad news here, just more headline-making from an innovative, ever-maturing group of musicians." Yahoo! Music UK gave it a score of seven out of ten and said that "At these transcending moments, 'Good News...' is elevated into excellence. But overall, there is too much Mouse that bores and not enough Mouse that roars." Almost Cool gave it a score of 6.75 out of ten and said that "Probably the biggest complaint could be that the group has tightened up their sound even more on this release, leaving behind even more of the roughshod qualities that made their earlier discs blister with such energy."

Other reviews are very average or mixed: The Guardian gave the album three stars out of five and called it "A useful addition to a genre that prizes brain over brawn." Blender also gave it three stars out of five and said that "[Brock is] adept at wringing out emotion while straddling sentimentality, but too often here, gauche studio affectations make his sap sound plain cheap." Nude as the News gave it a score of six out of ten and stated, "A lot of major label-imposed ideas, like rhythm guitar and a heartbreakingly conventional new bass sound, combine to utterly ruin the record's first half. If you can make it through to News' innards, however, an EP's worth of something like better-recorded, more thought-out Lonesome Crowded West material awaits." Stylus Magazine gave the album a C and said of Modest Mouse, "Gone is pretty much everything they’ve learned in the last eight years or so, ditching all the progress they’ve made in favor of just making another Modest Mouse record. The results, needless to say, are disappointing." Uncut gave it two stars out of five and said that "There are some pleasantly elaborate, wayward songs here... Forays into funk and Tom Waits' scrapyard are cringe-inducing, though."

Track listing

Notes
The B-side "I've Got It All (Most)" of "Float On" is included between "Bury Me with It" and "Dance Hall" (Track 7) on the dualdisc edition of the album, and as the last track (Track 17) on the vinyl release.

Personnel
Modest Mouse
Isaac Brock – vocals (2-11, 13-16), guitar (3, 4, 6, 7, 10-15), banjo (8, 9, 11), baritone guitar (16), ukulele (5), piano (2), Rhodes (2), Hendx 3000 (10), whistle (2), freak beak (14)
Eric Judy – bass guitar (3, 4, 6, 7, 10, 13-15), acoustic guitar (2, 8, 16), backup vocals (3, 16), pump organ (11, 12), tin whistle (16), percussion (2), mellotron (3)
Dann Gallucci – guitar (2-4, 6-8, 10-12, 14, 15), keyboards (4, 6, 7, 10), piano (7, 13, 14), backup vocals (3, 16), mellotron (2, 10), drum loops (3, 6), pump organ (16), timpani (2), percussion (2), glockenspiel (7)
Benjamin Weikel – drums (2-4, 6-8, 10, 11, 13-15)
Tom Peloso – standup bass (8, 11, 12), fiddle (13)

Additional Personnel
 Dennis Herring – accordion on "Bukowski"
 The Rising Star Fife and Drum Band – drums on "The Good Times Are Killing Me", additional drums on "Bury Me With It"
 The Dirty Dozen Brass Band – horns on "Horn Intro" and "This Devil's Workday"
 Milo Chaska Judy – vocals on "Interlude (Milo)"
 The Flaming Lips – additional instrumentation on "The Good Times Are Killing Me"

Art and Design
Art and design - Houston

Chart positions

Weekly charts

Year-end charts

Singles

References

External links
 

Modest Mouse albums
2004 albums
Epic Records albums
Albums produced by Dennis Herring